Thomas Conway (1735–1800) was an Irish-born soldier who served in the French Army and in the American Continental Army.

Thomas or Tom Conway may also refer to:
Thomas W. Conway, Freedmen Bureau official in Alabama and Louisiana during the Reconstruction Era
Thomas F. Conway (1862–1945), American lawyer and politician; Lieutenant Governor of New York, 1911–1912
Thomas G. Conway, Canadian lawyer, former Treasurer of the Law Society of Upper Canada
Thomas H. Conway (1860–1940), American politician; Wisconsin State Assemblyman
Tom Conway (1904–1967), British actor
Tom Conway (footballer, born 1933), English soccer player for Port Vale
Tom Conway (footballer, born 1959), Irish soccer player
Thomas Conway (footballer), footballer from Northern Ireland
Tommy Conway (born 2002), British footballer
Tim Conway (1933–2019), American comedian and actor born Thomas Conway